The World Ecological Parties (WEP) is an international association of mainly ecological parties. The WEP was founded in November 2003 in Mainz, Germany and elected its first board in April 2004 in Strasbourg, France. The WEP is independent from the Global Greens, a competing political international that also organizes green parties. 

The WEP holds General Assembly meetings annually in April or May; the inaugural meeting occurred from 1–3 April 2005 in Lisbon, Portugal, the 2006 meeting was held in Vršac, Serbia on 6 and 7 May, the 2007 meeting was held from 25–27 May in Hungary.

Members

Current

Former

Other affiliated organisations

Reference:

Leadership

External links
World Ecological Parties Home Page

References

Political internationals
Green political parties
Organizations established in 2003
2003 establishments in Germany
Organisations based in Mainz